Karnail Singh Somal is a well known Punjabi prose-writer. He is recipient of the prestigious  Sahitya Akademi Award (Bal Sahitya Puraskar 2020 for his book in Punjabi 'Phoolaan da shehar').

Biography

He was born in village Kalour, District Fatehgarh Sahib (erstwhile in District. Patiala), Punjab, on 28 September 1940, as per school record. However, as per his mother, he was born in the early morning of Maghi, first day of the month of Magh. His father's name is Prem Singh and mother's name is Surjeet Kaur.

Education
He got his early education in his village school. He matriculated from Govt. High School Bassi Pathana in 1958. Because of financial difficulties, he could not continue his education further, he got a petty job. However, his yearning for education led him to pursue his studies privately. He did his M.A. in Punjabi(standing third in the university) and M.A. in Hindi. Later on he got his PhD from Punjab University. The topic of his thesis was "A Study of Free Verse in Punjabi (up to 1950)".

Service
As he had done O.T. and BEd, so he started working as a school teacher. Thereafter, he joined Punjab School Education Board as Language Expert. About two years later he was selected as Assistant Director in Punjabi Teaching And Research Section of the Board. There his main contribution was in writing and editing Punjabi text-books. He retired from that post in September 1998.

Personal life
He married Salinder Kaur in 1966. They have two daughters- Manpreet Kaur (1969) and Jagpreet Kaur(1973).

Works

He has been writing for leading Punjabi newspapers for more than 35 years. He wrote literary essays, contributed to various Punjabi newspapers and journals. He wrote stories and poems for children. He did research work on Bhai Ditt Singh Giani.

Prose books

Research
Since very young age, the author was inspired by Bhai Ditt Singh Giani, Singh Sabha fame scholar, who was also born in village Kalaur. After a lot of research, the author wrote a book on this legendary writer, speaker, reformer, journalist and editor. The name of the book is "ਭਾਈ ਦਿੱਤ ਸਿੰਘ ਗਿਆਨੀ – ਜੀਵਨ ਰਚਨਾ ਤੇ ਸ਼ਖਸੀਅਤ  (Bhai Ditt Singh Giani-Jeevan, Rachna Te Shaksiat )" ( 2003). Its revised edition was Published by Singh Brothers Amritsar in 2005.

Children's literature
He writes for children regularly. He started writing for his grand-daughters living in Canada and used to email stories and poems to them. He has penned more than two dozen books. He writes for the magazines published by the Punjab School Education Board – ਪੰਖੜੀਆਂ, ਪਰਾਈਮਰੀ ਸਿਖਿਆ  (Pankhrian, Primary Sikhia). Besides he wrote four books for school students, two grammar books and two essay books.

Works for students

See also
 List of Indian writers

References 

 http://www.tribuneindia.com/2004/20040801/spectrum/book7.htm

Punjabi-language writers
1940 births
Living people